Delfinen (Swedish for dolphins) may refer to:

 , various Swedish Navy ships
 Delfinen-class submarine, a Royal Danish Navy class
 , the lead ship of the class, launched in 1956
 , a Swedish royal barge constructed in 1787; see List of oldest surviving ships
 Coop Norrbotten Arena, Luleå, Sweden, an indoor sporting arena originally named Delfinen
 Delfinen, the student newspaper of Aarhus University, Aarhus, Denmark